The judicial system of Kyrgyzstan comprise a number of courts in a hierarchy:

Supreme Court of Kyrgyzstan
Military Courts of Kyrgyzstan (until December 2016)
Appeal courts of second instance at the oblast level
Local courts of first instance. 78 of these exist

In addition informal methods of dispute resolution judged by court elders (aksakals) exist outside of the formal legal hierarchy. The Constitutional Court was abolished with the adoption of the 2010 Constitution and its powers transferred to the Supreme Court.

See also
Central Electoral Commission of Kyrgyzstan
Prosecutor's Office of Kyrgyzstan
Council for the Selection of Judges

References

 
Law of Kyrgyzstan